Shabas may refer to one of the following:
15427 Shabas, a main-belt asteroid
An acronym for the Israel Prison Service
The seventh day of the week or Shabbat in Judaism

See also
Shaba (disambiguation)